Parti Pesaka Bumiputera Bersatu (PBB) is a right-wing political party in Malaysia. It is currently the largest political party in Sarawak. Parti Pesaka Bumiputera Bersatu was formed from the combination of three parties in Sarawak; Parti Negara Sarawak, Barisan Rakyat Jati Sarawak and Parti Pesaka Anak Sarawak. The formation of the party was for the purpose of the improvement of the livelihood and protect the rights of the Bumiputera in many fields such as politics, economy and social. Formerly a part of Semenanjung-based coalition Barisan Nasional (BN), following the defeat of BN in the 2018 general election and in the aftermath of a meeting between all Sarawak-based BN coalition parties on 12 June 2018, PBB left the coalition to form a new Sarawak-based coalition, Sarawak Parties Alliance.

The meaning of "Bumiputera" 

Bumiputera is a Malaysian political term and translates to son of earth. Being mentioned in the party's name, this directly relates to the ethnic groups that are seen as native to the state of Sarawak. Members of the party are solely of Sarawak Bumiputera ethnicity. In article 161a of the Federal Constitution of Malaysia, 21 ethnic groups are classified as "natives of Sarawak", among these are the Ibans, Bidayuhs, Melanaus, Orang Ulus and several other Dayak people, as well as local Muslim-Malays of Sarawak.

Predecessors

Parti Negara Sarawak (PANAS) 
PANAS which was formed on 9 April 1960 by Datu Patinggi Abang Haji Mustapha, was the second political party to be formed after Sarawak United People's Party.

Barisan Ra'ayat Jati Sarawak (BARJASA) 
BARJASA was formed on 4 December 1961 by Tuanku Bujang Tuanku Othman. Abdul Rahman Ya'kub and Abdul Taib Mahmud were among the earliest members of the party.

Parti Pesaka Anak Sarawak (PESAKA) 
Parti Pesaka Anak Sarawak was formed in Sibu in August 1962 to cater for the Ibans of Batang Rajang. Its promoters refused to join the Sarawak National Party, which they claimed only catered for Ibans from Saribas. Among the initiators of the party were Penghulu Masam Anak Radin, Pengarah Banyang, Penghulu Chundi Anak Resa and Penghulu Umpau. Temenggong Jugah, Temenggong Oyong Lawai Jau and Jonathan Bangau joined later. While Jugah and Oyong Lawai Jau were incipiently members of PANAS, Bangau was from SUPP. Other Penghulus from other divisions such as Penghulu Tawi Sli (Second Division) and Penghulu Abok Anak Jalin (Bintulu) also joined PESAKA. PESAKA was therefore known as the Penghulus’ Party. However, the person who actually mooted the idea of forming PESAKA was Thomas Kana, a former dresser at Kuala Belait. He was made the first secretary-general of the party.

Formation of Parti Bumiputera 
To ensure the domination of Muslim Bumiputra in Sarawak politics, PANAS and BARJASA initiated a plan of merger a few months after the local council elections of Sarawak in 1963. Initially, both parties were willing to dissolve themselves in order to allow United Malays National Organisation to enter Sarawak. However, UMNO was not interested in accepting non-Muslim-Malay bumiputeras as members. Therefore, the Malaysian federal government recommended that the two parties combine to form a new separate party. After a series of negotiations, Parti Bumiputera Sarawak was formed on 30 March 1968. On the following day after the merger, Abang Ikhwan Zaini was elected as the president of Parti Bumiputera, Tuanku Haji Bujang as vice-president, and Taib Mahmud as the secretary-general of the party. According to Sanib Said (former curator of Sarawak State Museum):

Parti Bumiputera exercised a significant role in the Sarawak cabinet under the leadership of Sarawak chief minister Tawi Sli. Taib Mahmud dominated most of the decision making. Parti Bumiputera and Sarawak Chinese Association were the members of Sarawak Alliance. During the 1970 Sarawak state election, Parti Bumiputera won 12 seats while SCA won 3 seats out of a total of 48 seats. However, not a single party command a majority in Council Negri (now Sarawak State Legislative Assembly). Abdul Rahman from Parti Bumiputera was able to convince SUPP to form a state government with him as the chief minister.

Formation of PBB 
Parti Bumiputera had already initiated negotiations with PESAKA about the merger of both parties in 1968. However, PESAKA refused to enter into a merger in fear that Muslim bumiputera members from Parti Bumiputera would dominate the new party, leaving its Iban and Bidayuh members sidelined. PESAKA decided to join Sarawak Alliance without a merger to preserve their interests in Sarawak politics. However, in the 1970 state election, PESAKA won only 8 seats, whereas 12 seats were won by Parti Bumiputera and another 12 seats by SNAP. PESAKA was not able to nominate a new chief minister from their own party unlike in 1966. Ultimately another negotiation was held between PESAKA and Parti Bumiputera in September 1972 and both sides eventually agreed to a merger on 5 January 1973. The new Parti Pesaka Bumiputera Bersatu party was then officially registered on 30 April 1973.

The party was divided into two wings namely:
 BUMIPUTERA wing which consisted of Muslim-Malay, Melanau, Kedayan, Brunei-Malay, Jatti Mereik, and Orang Ulu members
 PESAKA wing which consisted of Iban, Bidayuh, Kenyah, and Kelabit members

Objectives of PBB 
 To protect and defend Malaysia's independence, sovereignty, and character.
 To uphold both the federal and state constitution.
 To combating against corruption, racism, illegal money laundering, and political power abuse among all party's members.
 To protect and defend the principles enshrined in the federal and state constitution, especially on position, fundamental rights, and special privileges of Bumiputera.
 To protect and guarantee the future rights of bumiputera.
 To develop all Sarawakian, specifically, and also all Malaysian, generally, in all various fields, mostly in education, politics, financial, economic & trades, social, public safety, youth & women communities, cultures & arts, and sports.
 To promote and protect the feeling of harmony and unity spirits of all Sarawakians towards creating a strong united region in Sarawak.
 To promoting the harmonious, peaceful, safe and prosperous Malaysia to all around the world.
 To protect the rule of parliamentary democracy.
 To protect, strengthen, and giving justice for the region of Sarawak, as based on Malaysia Agreement 1963 (MA63).
 To support and defend the United Nation's charter.
 To take effective steps in eradicating subversive movements which could compromise Malaysia's security.

Party structure 
The party structure of PBB is in many ways resembles to that of the national party United Malays National Organisation (UMNO) due to the influence exerted by Abdul Rahman Ya'kub. PBB has four levels of bureaucracy namely:
 General Assembly (similar to UMNO General Assembly)
 Supreme Council (similar to UMNO Supreme Council)
 Branches (set up in each state constituencies in Sarawak, similar to UMNO divisions which is set up in each parliamentary constituency in Malaysia except for the state of Sarawak.)
 Sub-branches (similar to UMNO branches)
 Each level will have its own youth and women wings

The party's general assembly is held every 3 years to assemble all party leaders and grassroot members to discuss party policies, responsibility of Supreme Council, and to elect party leaders into Supreme Council but does not influence party directions and policies.  The party constitution was amended so that "the party's system of representation of at general assemblies in line with the system used by UMNO". Therefore,  a chairman will be in-charge of the general assembly, allowing the party president take an active role during the assembly. The party's first ever general assembly was held from 13 to 14 July 1974, less than a month before the 1974 Malaysian general election. All the party's top posts were not contested at that time. In this general assembly, Abang Abu Bakar and Salleh Jafaruddin (Rahman's nephew) from bumiputera wing were elected to the party's executive committee. Alfred Jabu Numpang, from PESAKA wing was also elected to become youth chief of the party. He would later become deputy chief minister of Sarawak under the chieftainship of Taib Mahmud.

The Supreme Council consisted of:
 Yang di-Pertua (also known as president)
 Deputy Yang di-Pertua (also known as Deputy president)
 Vice-Yang di-Pertuas (also known as vice-presidents, consisted of 9 people)
 Secretary-general
 Deputy secretary-general
 Assistant secretary-general (5 people)
 Treasurer
 Assistant treasurer
 Publicity chief
 Assistant publicity chief
 Appointed executive committee members (11 people)
 Elected executive committee members (20 people)

During the formation of PBB, both Parti Bumiputera and PESAKA agreed to elect a PESAKA leader to become the president of the party. The party had 7 vice-presidents instead of the current 9 members. 4 vice-president posts will be given to Bumiputera wing while 3 will be given to PESAKA wing. The secretary-general post will be given to Bumiputera wing while assistant secretary-general posts will be divided among Bumiputera wing (1 person) and PESAKA wing (3 people). The rest of the party posts were given to Bumiputera wing while youth chief post will be given to PESAKA wing.

Leadership structure 

 President:
 Abang Abdul Rahman Zohari Abang Openg
 Deputy President:
 Douglas Uggah Embas
 Awang Tengah Ali Hasan
 Senior Vice-president:
 Fadillah Yusof
 Stephen Rundi Utom 
 Vice-president:
 Julaihi Narawi
 Gerawat Gala
 Gerald Rentap Jabu
 Abdul Karim Rahman Hamzah
 Annuar Rapaee
 Abdul Rahman Junaidi
 Roland Sagah Wee Inn
 Women Chief (Vice-president):
 Fatimah Abdullah
 Deputy Women Chief:
 Angelina Ujang
 Rohani Abdul Karim
 Vice Women Chief:
 Nancy Shukri
 Umang Nangku Jabu
 Sharifah Hasidah Sayeed Aman Ghazali
 Youth Chief (Vice-president):
 Miro Simuh
 Deputy Youth Chief:
 Allan Siden Gambong
 Lukanisman Awang Sauni
 Vice Youth Chief:
 Royston Valentine 
 Malcom Layang Jimbun
 Anderson Kalang Lah
 Secretary-General:
 Alexander Nanta Linggi
 Deputy Secretary-General:
 Ibrahim Baki
 Treasurer:
 Abdul Hamid Sepawi
 Information Chief:
 Haji Idris Buang
 Executive Secretary:
 Awang Bujang Awang Antek

 Central Committee Members (Bumiputera Wing):
 Hazland Abang Hipni
 Mohamad Razi Sitam
 Abdullah Saidol
 Aidel Lariwoo
 Fazzruddin Abdul Rahman 
 Shafiee Ahmad
 Razaili Gapor
 Awla Idris
 Yusuf Abdul Wahab
 Juanda Jaya
 Mohamad Duri
 Awangku Jinal Abedin Datuk Pengiran Jawa
 Haidar Khan Asghar Khan
 Mohammed Kamaluddin Mohamad Effendie
 Mohamad Sardon Zainal 
 Syed Hamzah Wan Hamid Edruce 
 Central Committee Members (Pesaka Wing):
 Henry Sum Agong
 Robert Lawson Chuat
 Jefferson Jamit Unyat
 Jerip Susil
 William Mawan Ikom
 Dennis Ngau
 Simon Sinang Bada
 John Ilus
 Lidam Assan
 Daniel Jubang Kayan
 Mikai Mandau
 Luyoh Akau
 Ugak Sanggau
 Robert Laing Anyie
 Willie Mongin

List of party leaders

Yang di-Pertua of Parti Pesaka Bumiputera Bersatu 

After the formation of PBB, Temenggong Jugah Anak Barieng was appointed as the first president of the PBB while Taib Mahmud was appointed deputy president and Abdul Rahman Ya'kub was appointed the secretary-general of the party. In September 1975, Abdul Rahman suddenly announced his retirement from politics due to criticisms to his administration of the Sarawak state. Few weeks later, Temenggong Jugah also announced his retirement as the president of PBB. In October 1975, Taib Mahmud was appointed to the president of PBB to fill the vacancy left by Temenggong Jugah while Leonard Linggi, the son of Temenggong Jugah, was appointed to the secretary-general post, replacing Abdul Rahman. However, Abdul Rahman remained as the executive member of PBB and the leader of Sarawak Barisan Nasional (BN). Alfred Jabu moved his rank to the deputy president post while Celestine Ujang fill the youth chief post left vacant by Alfred Jabu.

Two months later, Abdul Rahman changed his mind while he announced that he would not retire in the next five years. Abdul Rahman decided to take over the PBB presidency from Taib. For Taib, this was a dilemma but all the other party posts have been occupied. Taib demanded his uncle Abdul Rahman to create another deputy president post for him by changing the party constitution. Finally during the 1977 PBB general assembly meeting, another deputy president post was created and given to Taib while Abdul Rahman became the president of the party.

Rahman retired from politics on 26 March 1981 and his nephew Taib Mahmud succeeded him as the PBB president for the second time. After holding the post for 33 years, Taib Mahmud retired from politics while allowing his former brother-in-law, Adenan Satem to take over the party on 1 March 2014 and he would hold the post until his death on 11 January 2017.

Following the death of Adenan Satem, Abang Abdul Rahman Johari Abang Openg was appointed as the 6th President of PBB on 13 January 2017.

Elected representatives

Dewan Negara (Senate)

Senators

Dewan Negara (Senate) 

 His Majesty's appointee:
 Susan Chemerai Anding (PBB)
 elected by the Sarawak State Legislative Assembly:
 Nuing Jeluing (PBB)
 Ahmad Ibrahim (PBB)

Dewan Rakyat (House of Representatives)

Members of Parliament of the 15th Malaysian Parliament 

PBB has 14 MPs in the House of Representatives.

Dewan Undangan Negeri (State Legislative Assembly)

Malaysian State Assembly Representatives 

Sarawak State Legislative Assembly

PBB state governments

General election results

State election results

References

Notes 
 Chin, James. 2003: The Melanau-Malay Schism Erupts Again: Sarawak at the Polls. In: New Politics in Malaysia. Lok Kok Wah / Johan Saravanamuttu, Singapore: Institute of South East Asian Studies, pp. 213–227
 James Chin.  “The More Things Change, The More They Remain The Same”, in Chin Kin Wah & D. Singh (eds.) South East Asian Affairs 2004 (Singapore: Institute of South East Asian Studies, 2004)
 James Chin.  “Autonomy: Politics in Sarawak” in Bridget Welsh (ed) Reflections: The Mahathir Years,  (Washington DC: Johns Hopkins University Press, 2004) pp. 240–251

External links 
 PBB website
 Youth PBB website
 Wanita PBB website

Political parties in Sarawak
1973 establishments in Malaysia
Political parties established in 1973
Ethnic political parties
Conservative parties in Malaysia
Social conservative parties